"Fastlove" is a song by English singer-songwriter George Michael, released on 22 April 1996 by Virgin Records in the United Kingdom and by DreamWorks Records in the United States as the second single from his third album, Older (1996). Written by Michael, Patrice Rushen, Freddie Washington and Terri McFaddin and produced by Michael and Jon Douglas, the song interpolates the 1982 single "Forget Me Nots" by Patrice Rushen.

The song received positive reviews from music critics. Commercially, the song topped the charts in six countries: Australia, Hungary, Italy, Spain, and the United Kingdom, and it also reached number one on the Canadian RPM Adult Contemporary chart. It was Michael's seventh and final number-one single in the UK during his lifetime and is his seventh-most downloaded track there, earning a gold certification from the British Phonographic Industry (BPI) for selling and streaming over 600,000 units. It was nominated for Best Single at the 1997 Brit Awards. In the United States, the single peaked at number eight on the Billboard Hot 100, giving Michael his 15th top-10 hit and final Hot 100 appearance.

The song's accompanying music video, directed by Vaughan Arnell and Anthea Benton, was nominated for the video category at the Brit Awards and three MTV Video Music Awards in 1996, eventually winning the International Viewer's Choice Award—MTV Europe.

Recording
In an interview of 2022, Jon Douglas talked about the making of the song. While working on production of Lisa Moorish's album, he asked George to sing with her on the Wham! cover "I'm Your Man". After that, George asked Jon to work with him on the album. 

The initial concept of the song was a latin and bossa nova song. While writing the song, George changed his idea, and wanted a more energetic vibe. He changed his composition and asked Jon to help him to make a more energetic song. 

While he changed his composition, the two used his vocal performance and the sax played by Andy Hamilton in reference to help re-construct the song. Jon created a new musical arrangement to complete the sax part and the vocal performance. The "Forget Me Nots" sample was a change that George added at the last minute, as he wanted to change the end of the song. Jon didn't like the idea at first and before working to the transition, he listened the song over and over for  two weeks to work on the transition at the end of the song.

Release
An energetic tune about needing gratification and fulfillment without concern for commitment, "Fastlove" was the second single taken from Michael's third studio album, Older, which was his first studio album in six years and only the third of his solo career. For the single's B-side, a remake of the Wham! song "I'm Your Man" was used. Entitled "I'm Your Man '96", it was an update of one of their last singles, a decade earlier.

Jon Kutner from 1000 UK Number One Hits said the line "Stupid Cupid keeps on calling me and I see lovin' in his eyes" had a dual interpretation which could imply Michael's homosexuality.

Critical reception
While reviewing Older, Stephen Thomas Erlewine from AllMusic said although "Fastlove" is the album's only dance track, it still "lacks the carefree spark of his earlier work." He later still chose the song as his one of his "track picks." Larry Flick from Billboard described it as a "sleek groove that is a direct descendant of "Good Times" by Chic." He noted that Michael "deftly cruises between breathy sensuality and full-bodied belting", adding that the "icing on the cake is a chorus and refrain that are immediate sing-along fodder." Daina Darzin from Cash Box wrote that "Fastlove" "pumps up both the volume and the velocity for a terminally danceable, happy-feet track that's sure to become a staple in discos across the U.S." She also said that it features "the sort of ultra-lush, opulent soul vibe that's been Michael's hallmark throughout his career." The Daily Vault's Melanie Love called it a "plea for noncommittal, one-night stands as a way to avoid the pain of relationships". She noted further, "It's got a silky-smooth groove with touches of brass, and Michael's voice is as stellar as ever, slick and teasing yet somehow revelatory, giving this track a hookiness despite lacking an actual chorus."

Entertainment Weeklys Jim Farber gave the song an "A". He stated, "It took real guts to release a salute to a one-night stand in this, the era of abstinence," also praising its "devilishly seductive bass" and "sleekly probing horns". Farber concluded his review by calling the track "best slow-groove dance record since Lisa Stansfield's 'All Around the World'." Irish newspaper Evening Herald said it is "very like" his 1992 hit "Too Funky", adding that it "restores George to his rightful place as purveyor of whiteboy R&B to a middle-class audience." Hans-Petter Kjøge from Norwegian newspaper Fredrikstad Blad described it as "quality pop of the best brand." Swedish newspaper Göteborgs-Tidningen said it is "nicely funky". A reviewer from Music & Media called it a "uncomplicated, good-time funky dance track in which the repetition of the title has a lasting effect." They also commented that the production and atmosphere is "owing much to late-'70s disco grooves". Music Week rated it five out of five, adding that "it's got all the right ingredients for Top 10 success — Michael's crooning vocals over an uptempo dancey beat. Radio play is already substantial." Victoria Segal from NME noted "the thrill-stalking emptiness" of the song. Writing about the album for Rolling Stone, Al Weisel called it a "bouncy disco concoction", that is "flavored with Dr. Dre-style whistling synths." 

Michael E. Ross from Salon Magazine said that Michael "gets back to bold, bumptious funk, the singer clearly reveling in those buoyant rhythms of the not-too-distant past." In 2014, Brendon Veevers from British webzine Renowned for Sound ranked the song at number 4 on his "Top 10 George Michael Hits" list, stating: "[The song] is a slick, ultra-modern dance-pop track that sits quite contrasting to the rest of the Older tracks but has held up exceptionally well over the past almost-20 years since it was offered to us." In 2017, Dave Fawbert of ShortList Magazine called Fastlove "one of the greatest songs ever made", noting that, at a time when Britpop was at its height "George Michael decided to completely ignore it and release a truly slinky R&B/soul number which announced, with the utmost style, that he would be just as relevant in the '90s as he had been in the '80s." He was also full of praise for Fastlove Part II, although criticized the "Summer Mix" of the song as lacking "the fruity bass of the original". Fawbert later produced a half-hour version of Fastlove as a homage.

This song was featured in and a part of the soundtrack for the 2019 film Last Christmas.

Chart performance
The song reached the number one spot in United Kingdom, where it stayed for three weeks. It also reached number one in Australia, Hungary, Italy and Spain. "Fastlove" later became Michael's seventh-most downloaded track in the United Kingdom, according to Official Charts Company in 2014.

In the United States, "Fastlove" peaked at number eight and has since become a classic in George Michael's catalogue. It finished at number 62 on the US Billboard year-end chart. To date, this is the final George Michael single to enter the Billboard Hot 100. Additionally, it peaked at number 10 on the Billboard Rhythmic chart and number 14 on the Billboard Mainstream Top 40. 

In Canada, "Fastlove" peaked at number four on the RPM Top Singles chart and number one on the RPM Adult Contemporary chart.

Music video
Directed by Vaughan Arnell and Anthea Benton, the music video begins with a flickering virtual reality image of a woman on a bed followed by a man sitting in a black chair using a high-tech remote control device to "flip" through a variety of sexual virtual reality characters. Michael appears in the black chair, which is equipped with speakers. At one point, one of the dancers is shown wearing headphones displaying the word 'FONY' in the style of the Sony corporate logo, a reference to the contractual dispute Michael was having at the time with Sony Music Entertainment (formerly CBS Records). Throughout the video, various men and women who display a wide spectrum of characteristics, including one who is shy, another who is lustful, and another who is a complete emotional wreck (played by Rachel Williams), sit in the chair and use the remote control to summon more sexual characters. As the video ends, Michael is seen dancing while water rains down on him. The video ends with the same flickering virtual reality image that introduces to the video. It was published on YouTube in September 2010. By November 2020, the video has been viewed over 33.7 million times.

The music video was nominated for three 1996 MTV Video Music Awards, including: Best Dance Video, Best Choreography in a Video and International Viewer's Choice Award—MTV Europe — which it won.

Live performances

Michael performed the song on his MTV Unplugged segment on 11 October 1996 in London, the taping later premiered on the network on 11 December. Barry Walters in a review for The Advocate, describing the performance: "During 'Fastlove' he changes the melody considerably, and a huge mass of background singers drops all sorts of gospel-influenced vocal doodads." The live audio of the song was then uploaded onto Michael's official SoundCloud.

"Fastlove" was the opening song for his first leg for 25 Live with graphics flowed behind and beneath him on a curved, cascading screen.

Adele performed the song during the 59th Annual Grammy Awards, in tribute to Michael. She restarted her slow, mournful arrangement of it at one point because she was not satisfied with how it was going and saying that Michael was too important to her for her to not get it right.

Track listings

 UK, Australasian, and Japanese CD single "Fastlove Part I" – 5:27
 "I'm Your Man" – 4:06
 "Fastlove Part II" (fully extended mix) – 9:28

 UK 12-inch singleA1. "Fastlove Part II" (fully extended mix)
B1. "I'm Your Man"
B2. "Fastlove Part I"

 UK cassette single and European CD single "Fastlove Part I" – 5:27
 "I'm Your Man" – 4:06

 US CD single "Fastlove" (full version)
 "I'm Your Man '96"
 "Fastlove" (summer mix)

 US 7-inch and cassette single "Fastlove" (full version) – 5:24
 "I'm Your Man '96" – 4:10

 US 12-inch single'
A2. "Fastlove" (extended version) – 9:29
A2. "Fastlove" (full version) – 5:25
B1. "I'm Your Man '96" – 4:06
B2. "Fastlove" (summer mix) – 4:42

Charts

Weekly charts

Year-end charts

Certifications

Release history

References

1996 singles
1996 songs
DreamWorks Records singles
George Michael songs
Music videos directed by Vaughan Arnell
Number-one singles in Australia
Number-one singles in Hungary
Number-one singles in Italy
Number-one singles in Spain
Songs about casual sex
Songs written by George Michael
Songs written by Patrice Rushen
Song recordings produced by George Michael
UK Singles Chart number-one singles
Virgin Records singles